Rainbow Trust Children's Charity provides emotional and practical support to families who have a child with a life-threatening or terminal illness. Their headquarters are in Leatherhead, Surrey. They have care workers based in Swindon, Essex, Southampton, Cumbria, Surrey, Manchester, Durham, and London.

The charity was founded in 1986 by Bernadette Cleary OBE when she helped a neighbour with palliative care for her child.

Activities 
The charity helps families by providing non-medical services, such as assistance with household chores,
sibling supervision, and transportation to and from medical appointments,
aiming to maintain normal family life. It also offers bereavement support.

References

External links
 Official Site
 Entry at Charity Commission for England and Wales's website

Children's charities based in England
Charities based in Surrey
Palliative care in the United Kingdom
Health charities in the United Kingdom